John Charles Stetson (September 6, 1920 – August 1, 2007) was an American government administrator.  He served as the Secretary of the Air Force between 1977 and 1979.

Stetson received a bachelor's degree in aeronautical engineering from the Massachusetts Institute of Technology in 1943 and entered into the engineering trades. During World War II, he served as a communications officer with the U.S. Navy. After the war, he returned to engineering work before taking a consultancy position with Booz Allen Hamilton in 1951. Stetson became president of the Houston Post publishing company in 1963. At the time of his appointment as Secretary of the Air Force, he was the head of office products supplier A.B. Dick Company.

References

1920 births
2007 deaths
United States Secretaries of the Air Force
United States Navy personnel of World War II
Massachusetts Institute of Technology alumni